Grape Island may refer to

Grape Island (West Virginia), in the Ohio River
Grape Island, West Virginia, an unincorporated community in Pleasants County, West Virginia
Grape Island (Lake Michigan), part of the Beaver Island (Lake Michigan) archipelago
Grape Island (Massachusetts), one of the Boston Harbor Islands
Grape Island (Essex County, Massachusetts), Plum Island Sound, Ipswich, Massachusetts
Grape Island (Lake Simcoe), Ontario, Canada